Sarhari railway station is located in Sarhari town, Sanghar district, Sindh, Pakistan.

See also
 List of railway stations in Pakistan
 Pakistan Railways

References

External links

Railway stations in Sanghar District
Railway stations on Karachi–Peshawar Line (ML 1)